Bruno Filipe Pereira Soares Almeida (born 9 September 1996) is a Portuguese professional footballer who plays as a winger for Santa Clara, on loan from Trofense.

Club career
Almeida is a youth product of Bairro Francos, Santa Cruz FC, Padroense and Paços de Ferreira. He began his senior career in 2015 with Sanjoanense in the Campeonato de Portugal. He followed that up with other teams in the division including Bustelo, Pedras Rubras, Anadia, and the reserves of Estoril. In the summer of 2019, he transferred to Trofense in the same division where he became a mainstay, and in his fourth season with the club helped them win the 2020–21 Campeonato de Portugal, earning promotion to the Liga Portugal 2. After a strong debut season in the second division, on 12 August 2022 he earned a loan to the Primeira Liga club Santa Clara for the 2022-23 season.

Honours
Trofense
Campeonato de Portugal : 2020–21

References

External links
 

1996 births
Living people
Footballers from Porto
Portuguese footballers
Association football wingers
A.D. Sanjoanense players
F.C. Pedras Rubras players
Anadia F.C. players
G.D. Estoril Praia players
C.D. Trofense players
C.D. Santa Clara players
Primeira Liga players
Liga Portugal 2 players
Campeonato de Portugal (league) players